Hatcheria macraei is a species of pencil catfish and the only species in its genus. This fish grows to about 20.8 centimetres (8.2 in) and originates from rivers east of the Andes in Argentina, between 29° and 45°30′S.

References

Trichomycteridae
Taxa named by Charles Frédéric Girard
Fish of South America
Freshwater fish of Argentina
Fish described in 1855